The Albanian Basketball League is the men's professional basketball league in Albania. It was founded in 1946 shortly after the formation of the Albanian Basketball Association and is now divided into two divisions, the Superliga and First Division, consisting of 12 teams each. The team with the most championships is BC Partizani Tirana who have won 33 championships in total, but none since 1996.

History
The Albanian Basketball League is the one of the oldest continuing basketball competitions in the region of the Balkans, having started in 1946. The league was formed less than two years after the Communist Party of Albania gained control of the country, and the sport gradually grew in popularity over the years before experiencing a rapid rise in popularity in the 1970s, leading to most cities and towns in Albania forming their own basketball clubs and building basketball grounds. Following the fall of communism in 1991 many basketball clubs were forced to fold due to lack of any investment, which led to the decline in the popularity of the sport as a whole in the country. However, since 1993 there has been some re-establishment of the folded teams as private investment along with some state funded has allowed teams to continue functioning.

Competition
The Albanian Basketball League consists of 12 teams, grouped evenly into two divisions, the Superliga and First Division. As each group contains 6 teams, they play each other four times in two separate phases during the regular season, once at home and once away in each phase. This means each team plays 20 games each during the regular season. A win in the regular season is worth two points and a loss is worth one point. At the end of the regular season the bottom two sides miss out on the play-offs, while the bottom club gets relegated from the Superliga to the First Division, the fifth placed side has to compete for a place in the Superliga against the second ranked team in the First Division.

Following the end of the regular season, the top four teams qualify for he play-offs, where the team which finished first plays the team which finished fourth while the second and third ranked teams play against each other. A winner is decided in the play-offs once a team has reached two victories, and they take it in turns to play at home until the two victories are reached. The finals is played between the two winners of the Superliga play-offs, with each team taking it in turns to play at home until one side has reached three victories.

Current teams

Superliga (2022–23)

First Division (2022–23)

Winners

All–Time Champions

BC Kamza Basket won the title 5 times between 2003 and 2007 as BC Valbona.

See also
 Albanian Basketball Cup
 Albanian Basketball Supercup

References

External links 
 Eurobasket.com League Page

 
Basketball leagues in Albania
1946 establishments in Albania
Sports leagues established in 1946